VCON is a fan run fantasy, gaming, and science fiction convention held annually in the metro Vancouver area of British Columbia, Canada. It has been hosted by the West Coast Science Fiction Association (WCSFA) since 1993, and by the Western Canadian Science Fiction Convention Committee Association (WCSFCCA) before that.

History
VCON is the oldest fan run science fiction convention across Canada and in the Pacific Northwest, spawning other fan run conventions in these regions (especially the Pacific Northwest) including Norwescon, OryCon, Con-Version and KeyCon. The first "VCON" (which was actually called the Vancouver SF Convention) was held April 9 and 10, 1971 at the Hotel Georgia in Vancouver with Ursula K. LeGuin as Guest of Honour. Its sponsoring organisations included the University of British Columbia Science Fiction Society (UBC SFFEN), the B.C. Science Fiction Association (an offshoot of the UBC club) and the Simon Fraser University Science Fiction Society (SF3).

Although 2011 was the 40th anniversary of the first VCON event, the event held in that year was VCON 37. This oddity in numbering occurred as a result of two things:

 For several years in the mid-1990s no official VCON event was held (though it was sometimes replaced by another WCSFA sponsored event without the VCON name, such as "The Science of Murder" in 1994 and "The Science of Survival" in 1995)
 Due to various time and resource constraints there were two VCON events that were deliberately organized to be smaller and more intimate and which were given the "half numbers" of 18.5 and 19.5.

VCON has hosted Canvention, Canada's national science fiction convention several times: VCON 14/Canvention 6 in 1986, VCON 26/Canvention 21 in 2001, VCON 32/Canvention 27 in 2007, and VCON 39/Canvention 34 in 2014. VCON has also hosted two Westercon, the travelling science fiction convention for Western North America, with Westercon 30/VCON 7 in 1977 and Westercon 44/VCON 19 in 1991.

Schedule 
VCON is held on the Canadian Thanksgiving long weekend (the observed Canadian Thanksgiving holiday is always the second Monday in October). The registration desk and the member hospitality room opens at noon on Friday, with programming starting in the mid-afternoon, and the event continues until early Sunday evening.

Features 

Highlights include discussion panels, an art show, dealers’ tables, authors’ readings, game room, book launches, workshops, crafts, and a costume contest. 

VCON features a large art show, with original 2-D and 3-D work and prints by both professional and fan artists, as well as workshops and demonstrations by featured artists.  Since the 1990s, there have also been two or more rooms devoted to tabletop and console (video) gaming.

The VCON spoof award, the Elron, is presented and selected passages of science fiction are publicly read.  R. Graeme Cameron, president of the British Columbia Science Fiction Association (BCSFA), has stated that the name "Elron" is not an allusion to science-fiction writer L. Ron Hubbard.  The awards are reported each year in the BCSFA's science fiction fanzine BCSFAzine.

During the Turkey Readings, panelists read selections from the worst published science fiction and fantasy fiction. Volunteers act out the story being read, and artists make a poster. Audience members can bid to make the reading stop or bid higher for the reading to continue. Funds raised go to CUFF, the Canadian Unity Fan Fund.

VCON has hosted the Aurora Awards ceremony six times, most recently in 2018.

VCON has a hospitality bar, room parties, and a Dead Dog party to celebrate the end of the convention.

Guests of Honour

See also
Science fiction fandom
Fantasy fandom
Fan convention
Gaming convention
List of science fiction conventions
Canadian science fiction

References

External links 
VCON Website
WCSFA Website

Science fiction conventions in Canada
Multigenre conventions